Matthew Yang King is an American actor. He has appeared on Riverdale, Powers, 24, Strong Medicine, and Numbers. He created the webseries World of Steam and has provided voiceover work for numerous television shows, video games, and commercials including Love, Death & Robots, Studio Ghibli's 25th Anniversary English dub of Only Yesterday with Daisy Ridley, the World of Warcraft franchise, G.I. Joe: Renegades, Transformers: Robots in Disguise, Fortnite, Supah Ninjas, and Marvel Heroes.

Early and personal life 
King studied acting at New York University Tisch School of the Arts and lived in New York until 1998, when he left to tour the United States with the musical Titanic, playing Quartermaster Robert Hichens and Bandsman Bricoux. The tour began in Los Angeles.

Career

Voice acting 
King has provided numerous voices for television, film, and video games, from the voice of the Host in the "The Witness" and Liang and Renshu in "Good Hunting". His work includes Father and Kozou in Studio Ghibli's Only Yesterday, Illidan Stormrage in the World of Warcraft franchise, The Persuader in Bruce Timm's Justice League vs The Fatal Five, The Atom in Injustice 2, Eian in Batman Ninja, and the voices of Splinter and Shredder in Teenage Mutant Ninja Turtles (TMNT). King is the voice of Apple in numerous television ads and also voiced both Liu Kang and Fujin in Mortal Kombat 11 and will voice Kung Lao in upcoming animated film Mortal Kombat Legends: Battle of the Realms.

Additionally, King was one of the creators and hosts of the long-running podcast, GeeksOn, with Aaron Hendricks, Donald Marshall, and Peter Gamble Robinson.

Film and television 
King has had recurring roles on Riverdale, Numbers, 24, and Strong Medicine. He starred opposite Danny Huston in the Bernard Rose film The Kreutzer Sonata, which also features King playing the violin.

Stage 
King's stage credits include the first Broadway touring production of Titanic: The Musical, East West Players' Yankee Dawg You Die as Bradley with Sab Shimono and The Tempest as Caliban with fellow NYU Tisch alumnus Daniel Dae Kim, and an NAACP award-winning hip-hop version of The Two Gentlemen of Verona called 2G's at Los Angeles' Sacred Fools Theater.

Writing 
Frustrated with playing stereotypically Asian roles in the early-mid 2000s, King began writing to create roles for minority actors "that people felt they could wrap their brains around that were about being ethnic...[and] racism." The Harrowing, his script with Peter Gamble featuring an African-American man as the lead in a horror film is in development.

Crowdfunding projects 
In 2017, King collaborated with cartoonist Tarol Hunt and fellow producers Phil LaMarr and Danielle Stephens to bring Hunt's webcomic, Goblins, to life as an animated series. The Goblins Animated campaign on Indiegogo was to produce a five-minute long mega-trailer/pilot that could be used to garner more interest in the project. King himself voices one of the characters, Fumbles. Notable voice actors make up the rest of the cast, including Phil LaMarr as Complains of Names, Billy West as Minmax, Maurice LaMarche as Forgath, Jim Cummings as Thaco, Tara Strong as Saves a Fox, Matthew Mercer as Big Ears, Jennifer Hale as Kin, and Steve Blum as Kore. The mega-trailer is currently under production.

In 2012, King created a Kickstarter project for his steampunk webseries called The World of Steam. Written, directed, and produced by King, the show is set in a Twilight Zone-type steampunk universe and featured Scott Folsom, Gail Folsom, Gina Torres, Mido Hamada, Karl E. Landler, Julian Curtis, Robin Atkin Downes, and King himself as the host, Mr. Liang. At the time, the series was the highest-grossing webseries ever on Kickstarter. The first episode, The Clockwork Heart, was released as a webisode in 2013 and contains music by composer Bear McCreary. The remainder of the series is still in the works and is being developed for television.

Steampunk work 
After the creation of the World of Steam webseries in 2012, King was seen as a leader in the Steampunk creative community. As a result, he was invited to serve as one of the three judges on the first-ever network Steampunk-themed reality show, Game Show Network's Steampunk'd in 2015. King cites his Steampunk influces as H.G. Wells, Jules Verne, H.P. Lovecraft, K.W. Jeter, Robert Howard, Sir Arthur Conan Doyle, and China Mieville, among others. He collaborated with Scott and Gail Folsom from the League of STEAM on the pilot episode for the World of Steam, "The Clockwork Heart," and was cited in the 2016 book, Like Clockwork: Steampunk Pasts, Presents, and Futures, edited by Rachel A. Bowser and Brian Croxall. His Love, Death and Robots episode, "Good Hunting," is Asian-inspired Steampunk. King has appeared at various Steampunk conventions as a presenter and judge, and is currently collaborating with Cheyenne Wright of Girl Genius on a new Steampunk project called The Cabinet of Curiosities.

Convention Appearances

Filmography

Live action roles

Television

Film

Voice over roles

Film

Television

Video games

Stage

Awards and nominations

References

External links 
 
 
 

Living people
American male actors of Chinese descent
American male film actors
American male television actors
American male video game actors
American male voice actors
American male musical theatre actors
New York University alumni
Tisch School of the Arts alumni
20th-century American male actors
21st-century American male actors
Hall High School (Connecticut) alumni
Year of birth missing (living people)
Place of birth missing (living people)